HR 4098, also known as HD 90508, is a binary star system in the northern constellation of Ursa Major at a distance of 75 light years. This object is barely visible to the naked eye as a dim, yellow star with an apparent visual magnitude of 6.45. It is approaching the Earth with a heliocentric radial velocity of 7.2 km/s.

The star system is a visual binary with a 3.466″ projected separation, identified as such in 1994–1997. The orbit of the binary is wide and highly uncertain due to the long period and high inclination.

The larger star, HD 90508A, is a very old main-sequence star approaching a turn-off from the main sequence. Very little dust remains in the stellar system, therefore the starlight of HR 4098 is one of the standards for non-polarized emission, polarization being below 0.2% in all bands. Unlike the majority of G-class stars, HD 90508A has a direct correlation between brightness and stellar activity. This behavior is shared with HD 88986 and the Sun.

Very little is known about the companion, which could be a K-class or M-class dwarf star.

References

G-type main-sequence stars
Binary stars
Solar analogs
Ursa Major (constellation)
BD+49 1961
090508
051248
4098
J10280388+4847067
0392